Zinaida Yevgenyevna Serebriakova (– 20 September 1967) was a Russian and later French painter.

Family

Zinaida Serebryakova was born on the estate of Neskuchnoye near Kharkov (now Kharkiv, Ukraine) into  the artistic Benois family in the Russian Empire.

Her father, Evgenii Lansere, was a sculptor and her mother, Ekaterina Lansere, was a painter. Her grandfather, Nicholas Benois, was a prominent architect, chairman of the Society of Architects and member of the Russian Academy of Science. Her uncle, Alexandre Benois, was a painter, founder of the Mir iskusstva art group. One of Zinaida's brothers, Nikolay Lanceray, was an architect, and her other brother, Yevgeny Yevgenyevich Lanceray, had an important place in Russian and Soviet art as a master of monumental painting and graphic art. The English actor and writer Peter Ustinov was also related to her.

Youth
In 1900, she graduated from a women's gymnasium (equivalent to grammar school or high school), and entered the art school founded by Princess Maria Tenisheva. She studied with Ilya Repin in 1901 and portrait artist Osip Braz between 1903 and 1905. From 1902 to 1903, she spent time in Italy, and from 1905 to 1906 she studied at the Académie de la Grande Chaumière in Paris.

In 1905, she married her first cousin, Boris Serebryakov, the son of Evgenyi's sister, and took his surname. Boris went on to become a railroad engineer.

Early success

Serebryakova's most famous self-portrait, At the Dressing-Table (1909, Tretyakov Gallery), was painted while she was snowed in at her family home and models from a nearby village were unable to travel there. Her brother Evgenii encouraged Serebryakova to enter the painting in an exhibition mounted by the Union of Russian Artists in 1910, where it was received with enthusiasm and purchased for the Tretyakov Gallery collection. The self-portrait was followed by Girl Bathing (1911, Russian Museum), a portrait of Ye.K. Lanceray (1911, private collection), and a portrait of the artist's mother Yekaterina Lanceray (1912, Russian Museum).

Serebryakova joined the Mir iskusstva movement in 1911.

From 1914 to 1917, Serebriakova produced a series of pictures on the theme of Russian rural life including Peasants (1914–1915, Russian Museum), Sleeping Peasant Girl (private collection).

When, in 1916, Alexander Benois was commissioned to decorate the Kazan Railway Station in Moscow, he invited Yevgeny Lanceray, Boris Kustodiev, Mstislav Dobuzhinsky, and Serebryakova to help him. Serebryakova took on the theme of the Orient: India, Japan, Turkey, and Siam are represented allegorically in the form of beautiful women. At the same time, she began compositions on subjects from classical mythology, but these remained unfinished.

Revolution

After the outbreak of the October Revolution in 1917, Serebriakova's life changed. In 1919, her husband Boris died of typhus. She was left without any income, responsible for her four children and her sick mother. All the reserves of Neskuchnoye had been plundered, so the family suffered from hunger. She had to give up oil painting in favour of the less expensive techniques of charcoal and pencil. This was the time of her most tragic painting, House of Cards, which depicts their four fatherless children.

She did not want to switch to the Suprematist or Contructivist styles popular in the art of the early Soviet period, nor paint portraits of commissars, but she found some work at the Kharkov Archaeological Museum, where she made pencil drawings of the exhibits. In December 1920, she moved to her grandfather’s apartment in Petrograd. After the October Revolution, inhabitants of private apartments were forced to share them with additional inhabitants, but Serebriakova was lucky – she was quartered with artists from the Moscow Art Theatre. Thus, Serebriakova's work during this period focuses on theatre life. Also around this time, Serebriakova's daughter, Tatiana, entered the academy of ballet, and Serebriakova created a series of pastels on the Mariinsky Theater.

Paris

In the autumn of 1924, Serebriakova went to Paris, having received a commission for a large decorative mural. On finishing this work, she intended to return to the Soviet Union, where her mother and the four children remained. However, she was not able to return, and although she was able to bring her children, Alexandre and Catherine, to Paris in 1926 and 1928 respectively, she could not do the same for her two other children, Evgenyi and Tatiana, and did not see them again for many years.

After this, Serebriakova traveled a great deal. In 1928 and 1930, she traveled to Africa, visiting Morocco. During a six-week trip to Morocco in December 1928, she created more than 130 portraits and cityscapes which she called “sketches,” drawn in haste as none of the locals would agree to pose, and only three landscapes for fear of straying too far from Marrakech. She was fascinated by the landscapes of northern Africa and painted the Atlas mountains, as well as Arab women and Africans in ethnic clothing. She also painted a cycle devoted to Breton fishermen. The salient feature of her later landscapes and portraits is the artist's own personality — her love of beauty, whether in nature or in people.

In 1947, Serebriakova at last took French citizenship, and it was not until Khruschev's Thaw that the Soviet Government allowed her to resume contact with her family in the Soviet Union. In 1960, after 36 years of forced separation, her older daughter, Tatiana (Tata), was finally allowed to visit her. At this time, Tatiana was also working as an artist, painting scenery for the Moscow Art Theatre.

Serebriakova's works were finally exhibited in the Soviet Union in 1966, in Moscow, Leningrad, and Kiev, to great acclaim. Her albums sold by the millions, and she was compared to Botticelli and Renoir. Serebriakova rejoiced at success in her homeland. However, although she sent about 200 of her works to be shown in the Soviet Union, the bulk of her work remains in France today.

Serebriakova died after a brain hemorrhage in Paris on 19 September 1967, at the age of 82. She is buried in Paris, at the Russian cemetery at Sainte-Geneviève-des-Bois.

Tribute
On 10 December 2020, Google celebrated her 136th birthday with a Google Doodle.

Selected artwork

See also
 List of Orientalist artists
 Orientalism

Notes

References

  (author's home page)
 
Brief desc.  Cover image and description.  Larger cover image showing her signature in Latin script. 
Illustrated monograph on the creative development and life of Zinaida Serebriakova by St. Petersburg art critic A. A. Rusakova.
 
Zinaida Serebriakova: Letters, contemporary views (literally: Zinaida Serebriakova: Letters, contemporaries on the artist)

External links

 Serebriakova's biography on the St. Petersburg State Academic Institute of Fine Arts, Sculpture, and Architecture
 Serebryakova's works at the Russian Art Gallery
 Illustrated description of 2006 auction in Montreal at which four nudes by Serebriakova sold.(Three show her signature in 1930s Paris. Two sold for over $500,000.)
 Illustrated biographical essay based on a 2004 book by V. D. Berlina. (The following portraits from the above site show her signature in Cyrillic script.)
Portrait of the ballerina Ye. N. Geydenreykh in red. 1923. 
Portrait of G. I. Teslenko. 1921. 
 Zinaida Serebriakova's 136th birthday on Google Doodle

1884 births
1967 deaths
Burials at Sainte-Geneviève-des-Bois Russian Cemetery
20th-century Russian painters
Russian symbolism
Painters from Saint Petersburg
Russian Impressionist painters
Benois family
Alumni of the Académie de la Grande Chaumière
Orientalist painters
20th-century Russian women artists
Soviet emigrants to France